Peter George Norman (15 June 1942 – 3 October 2006) was an Australian track athlete. He won the silver medal in the 200 metres at the 1968 Summer Olympics in Mexico City, with a time of 20.06 seconds. This remains an Oceanian record. He was a five-time national 200-metres champion.

Norman is probably best known as the third athlete pictured in the famous 1968 Olympics Black Power salute photograph, which occurred during the medal ceremony for the 200-metre event. He wore a badge of the Olympic Project for Human Rights in support of fellow athletes John Carlos and Tommie Smith. Norman was not selected for the 1972 Summer Olympics and retired from the sport soon after.

Life and career

Early life
Norman grew up in a devout Salvation Army family living in Coburg, a suburb of Melbourne in Victoria. Initially an apprentice butcher, Norman later became a teacher, and worked for the Victorian Department of Sport and Recreation towards the end of his life.

During his athletics career Norman was coached by Neville Sillitoe.

1968 Summer Olympics

The 200 metres event at the 1968 Olympics started on 15 October and finished on 16 October; Norman won his heat in a time of 20.17 seconds, which was briefly an Olympic record. He won his quarter-final and was second in the semi-final.

On the morning of 16 October, US athlete Tommie Smith won the 200-metre final with a world-record time of 19.83 seconds. Norman finished second in a time of 20.06 s, after catching and eventually passing U.S. athlete John Carlos at the finish line. Carlos finished in third place in 20.10 s. Norman's time was his all-time personal best and an Oceanian record that still stands.

Later career
Norman represented Australia at the 1969 Pacific Conference Games in Tokyo, and the 1970 Commonwealth Games in Edinburgh.

Norman retired from athletics after missing the 1972 Olympic team.

Before the 1968 Olympics, Norman was a trainer for the West Brunswick Australian rules football club as a way of keeping fit over winter during the athletic circuit's off season. He played 67 games for West Brunswick from 1972 to 1977 before coaching an under 19 team in 1978.

In 1985, Norman contracted gangrene after tearing his achilles tendon during a charity race, which nearly led to his leg being amputated. Depression, heavy drinking and pain killer addiction followed.

After battling depression, Norman worked at Athletics Australia as a sports administrator until 2006.

Death
Norman died of a heart attack on 3 October 2006 in Melbourne at the age of 64. The US Track and Field Federation proclaimed 9 October 2006, the date of his funeral, as Peter Norman Day. Thirty-eight years after the three made history, both Smith and Carlos gave eulogies and were pallbearers at Norman's funeral. At the time of his death, Norman was survived by his second wife, Jan, and their daughters Belinda and Emma, his first wife, Ruth, and children Gary, Sandra and Janita and four grandchildren.

Black power salute

Medal ceremony

After the 200 metres final, the three athletes went to the medal podium for their medals to be presented by David Cecil, 6th Marquess of Exeter. On the podium, during the playing of "The Star-Spangled Banner", Smith and Carlos famously joined in a Black Power salute. This salute was later described in Tommie Smith's autobiography as a human rights salute, not a Black Power salute.

Norman wore a badge on the podium in support of the Olympic Project for Human Rights (OPHR). After the final, Carlos and Smith had told Norman what they were planning to do during the ceremony. As journalist Martin Flanagan wrote: "They asked Norman if he believed in human rights. He said he did. They asked him if he believed in God. Norman, who came from a Salvation Army background, said he believed strongly in God. We knew that what we were going to do was far greater than any athletic feat. He said, 'I'll stand with you'. Carlos said he expected to see fear in Norman's eyes. He didn't; 'I saw love'." On the way to the medal ceremony, Norman saw the OPHR badge being worn by Paul Hoffman, a white member of the US rowing team, and asked him if he could wear it. It was Norman who suggested that Smith and Carlos share the black gloves used in their salute, after Carlos left his pair at the Olympic Village. This is the reason for Smith raising his right fist, while Carlos raised his left.

Treatment between 1968–1972

After the salute, Norman's career suffered greatly. A 2012 CNN profile said that "he returned home to Australia a pariah, suffering unofficial sanction and ridicule as the Black Power salute's forgotten man. He never ran in the Olympics again." Commentators say he was not selected for the Olympic Games in Munich in 1972 despite recording qualifying times, and was not welcomed even 32 years later at the 2000 Summer Olympics in Sydney. Carlos later stated that "If we [Carlos and Smith] were getting beat up, Peter was facing an entire country and suffering alone."

The Australian Olympic Committee maintains that Norman was not selected for the 1972 Olympics because he did not meet the selection standard which entailed an athlete equalling or bettering the Olympic qualifying standard (20.9) and performing creditably at the Australian Athletics Championships. Norman ran several qualifying times from 1969–1971 but he finished third in the 1972 Australian Athletics Championships behind Greg Lewis and Gary Eddy in a time of 21.6.

Contemporary reports show mixed opinion on whether Norman should have been sent to the Munich Olympics. After coming third in the trials, Norman commented: "All I had to do was to win, even in a slow time, and I think I would have been off to Munich". The Age correspondent wrote Norman "probably ran himself out of the team at the National titles"—but also noted he was injured—and continued, "If the selectors do the right thing, Norman should still be on the plane to Munich." On the other hand, Australasian Amateur Athletics''' magazine stated "The dilemma for selectors here was how could they select Norman and not Lewis. Pity that Peter did not win because that would have been the only requirement for a Munich ticket".

Recognition
For his involvement as an ally in the 1968 Olympics Black Power salute protest, he has appeared in many works of public art, as well as movies on the subject.
 An airbrush mural of the trio on podium was painted in 2000 in the inner-city suburb of Newtown in Sydney. Silvio Offria, who allowed an artist known only as "Donald" to paint the mural on his house in Leamington Lane, said that Norman came to see the mural, "He came and had his photo taken, he was very happy." The monochrome tribute, captioned "THREE PROUD PEOPLE MEXICO 68", was under threat of demolition in 2010 to make way for a rail tunnel but is now listed as an item of heritage significance.
 On 17 October 2003, San Jose State University unveiled a statue commemorating the 1968 Olympic protest; Norman was not included as part of the statue itself, as he insisted that his place be left unoccupied so that others viewing the statue could "take a stand" against racism; however, he was invited to deliver a speech at the ceremony.
 Norman's nephew Matt Norman directed, produced, and wrote the documentary film Salute (2008), about him and his role in the 1968 Olympics Black Power salute. Paul Byrnes, in his Sydney Morning Herald review of Salute, said that the documentary makes it clear why Norman stood with the other two athletes. Byrnes writes, "He was a devout Christian, raised in the Salvation Army [and] believed passionately in equality for all, regardless of colour, creed or religion—the Olympic code". In October 2018, Matt Norman with the help of journalist Andrew Webster released his uncle's official biography The Peter Norman Story''.
 In September 2016, a statue of Norman on the 1968 medal podium with Smith and Carlos was unveiled at the National Museum of African American History and Culture in Washington, D.C.
 During the building of Lakeside Stadium in Melbourne, Athletics Australia in partnership with the Victorian Government announced the erecting of a bronze statue of Norman to honour Norman's legacy as an athlete and advocate for human rights. They will also enshrine 9 October as Peter Norman Day within their organisation. It was unveiled on 9 October 2019 at the Albert Park athletics track, Melbourne.

Posthumous apology
In August 2012, the Australian House of Representatives debated a motion to provide a posthumous apology to Norman. The chamber passed an official apology motion on 11 October 2012, which read:

The original plan for the apology had point (3) state that the House: 'apologises to Peter Norman for the wrong done by Australia in failing to send him to the 1972 Munich Olympics, despite repeatedly qualifying'. This acknowledgement of a punitive reaction by Australia to his support of Smith and Carlos was omitted from the final apology.

In a 2012 interview advocating for the apology, Carlos said:

After the parliamentary apology, the Australian Olympic Committee (AOC) and others disputed the claims made about Norman being ostracised for supporting Carlos and Smith. The AOC did not believe that Norman was owed an apology, citing the following:
 Norman was cautioned by the AOC but not punished. Chef de Mission Judy Patching cautioned him on the evening of the medal ceremony and then gave Norman as many tickets as he wanted to go and watch a field hockey match.
 Norman was not selected for the 1972 Munich Olympics, as he did not meet the selection standard which entailed an athlete equalling or bettering the Olympic qualifying standard (20.9) and performing creditably at the Australian Athletics Championships. Norman ran several qualifying times from 1969–1971, but he finished third in the 1972 Australian Athletics Championships behind Greg Lewis and Gary Eddy in a time of 21.6.
 In the lead-up to the 2000 Sydney Olympics, the AOC stated "Norman was involved in numerous Olympic events in his home city of Melbourne. He announced several teams for the AOC in Melbourne and was on the stage in his Mexico 1968 blazer congratulating athletes. He was acknowledged as an Olympian and the AOC valued his contribution." Due to cost considerations, the AOC did not have the resources to bring all Australian Olympians to Sydney, and Norman was offered the same chance to buy tickets as other Australian Olympians. However, the United States invited him to participate and take part in the 2000 Sydney Olympics when they heard that his own country had failed to do so.

In 2018, the AOC awarded Norman posthumously the Order of Merit for his involvement of the 1968 protest, with AOC President John Coates stating: "I'm absolutely certain from all the history I've read that we didn't do the wrong thing by him. But I absolutely think we've been negligent in not recognising the role he played back then."

Competitive record

International competitions

National championships

Honours
Later in life, Norman received a number of honours from Australian sport bodies, including:

 1999 – Sport Australia Hall of Fame inductee
 2000 – Australian Sports Medal
 2010 – Athletics Australia Hall of Fame inductee
 2018 – Order of Merit from Australian Olympic Committee
 2022 - The Dawn Award

References

Annotations

Footnotes

Citations 
 
 

 
 
 
 

 
 
  - Total pages: 320 
 
  - Total pages: 64 
 
 
 
 
  - Total pages: 304

External links

 
 Peter Norman – Athletics Australia Hall of Fame
 
 
 
 

1942 births
2006 deaths
Australian male sprinters
Athletes (track and field) at the 1968 Summer Olympics
Olympic athletes of Australia
Olympic silver medalists for Australia
Athletes (track and field) at the 1962 British Empire and Commonwealth Games
Athletes (track and field) at the 1966 British Empire and Commonwealth Games
Athletes (track and field) at the 1970 British Commonwealth Games
Commonwealth Games bronze medallists for Australia
Commonwealth Games medallists in athletics
Athletes from Melbourne
Australian Salvationists
People educated at the Southport School
Recipients of the Australian Sports Medal
Sport Australia Hall of Fame inductees
Medalists at the 1968 Summer Olympics
Olympic silver medalists in athletics (track and field)
Australian activists
Anti-racism in Australia
People from Coburg, Victoria
Medallists at the 1966 British Empire and Commonwealth Games